Avraham Grossman (Hebrew: אברהם גרוסמן; born: March 10, 1936) is a professor emeritus in the Jewish history department in the Hebrew University of Jerusalem. Recipient of 2003 Israel Prize for his contributions to Jewish history.

Biography 
Avraham Grossman was born in 1936 in Tiberias and grew up in Mishmar HaYarden.

In 1948 his family moved to Haifa. He served in the Education and Youth Corps of the Israel Defense Forces.

After his military service, he started his studies in the Hebrew University of Jerusalem in Jewish history and Talmud for his bachelor's and master's degrees, respectively. His master's thesis was about Gershom ben Judah and was supervised by Ephraim Urbach. His doctoral work, The Rabbinical literature of Ashkenaz and Northern France in the eleventh century, was also supervised by Urbach. Grossman got his doctorate in 1974 and moved to London for a postdoc at SOAS, University of London, and manuscript research in the Bodleian Library.

Grossman was appointed lecturer in the Hebrew University of Jerusalem in 1976 and full professor in 1986. From 1991 to 1992 he was the head of the Jewish history department. In 2007 he became professor emeritus.

Grossman has been a visiting professor at Harvard University, Ohio State University and Yale University in the years 1985, 1986 and 1988 respectively.

Grossman has been married to Rachel since 1961, and has four children. One of them is a professor in the Bible department of Bar-Ilan University.

Grossman is a member of the Israel Academy of Sciences and Humanities.

Grossman won the Bialik Prize in 1996 for his book The Early Sages of France.

References

Living people
1936 births
Historians of Ashkenazi Jewry
Historians of Jews and Judaism
Israeli orientalists
Academic staff of the Hebrew University of Jerusalem
Israel Prize in history of the Jewish people recipients
Members of the Israel Academy of Sciences and Humanities
Israeli medievalists